Methuen's dwarf gecko (Lygodactylus methueni), also known commonly as the  Woodbrush dwarf gecko, is a species of lizard in the family Gekkonidae. The species is native to southern Africa.

Etymology
The specific name, methueni, is in honor of British naturalist Paul Ayshford Methuen.

Geographic range
L. methueni is endemic to South Africa and is found near Haenertsburg in the Woodbush Forest area and Haenertsburg Common.

Description
L. methueni is olive-grey.

Behaviour
L. methueni basks on the boles of large trees or on rocky outcrops.

Reproduction
L. methueni is oviparous.

Conservation status
Forestry plantations and frequent fires pose a threat to the habitat of L. methueni and have resulted in a reduction in the population.

References

Further reading
Branch, Bill (2004). Field Guide to Snakes and other Reptiles of Southern Africa. Third Revised edition, Second impression. Sanibel Island Florida: Ralph Curtis Books. 399 pp. . (Lygodactylus methueni, pp. 247–248 + Plate 91).
FitzSimons V (1937). "Three New Lizards from South Africa". Annals of the Transvaal Museum 17 (4): 275–279. (Lygodactylus methueni, new species, pp. 275–276, Figures 1–2).

Lygodactylus
Geckos of Africa
Endemic reptiles of South Africa
Reptiles described in 1937
Taxa named by Vivian Frederick Maynard FitzSimons
Taxonomy articles created by Polbot